James Craigen may refer to:

 James Craigen (footballer) (born 1991), English footballer
 James Craigen (politician) (born 1938), Scottish politician in the United Kingdom